Alisa LaGamma is the Ceil and Michael E. Pulitzer Curator of the Department of the Arts of Africa, Oceania, and the Americas at the Metropolitan Museum of Art.

She received her PhD from Columbia University in 1995 for a dissertation titled "The Art of the Punu Mukudj Masquerade: Portrait of an Equatorial Society", for which she carried out a year of fieldwork in southern Gabon.

In 2012 she received the Iris Award for Outstanding Scholarship of the Bard Graduate Center in recognition of her contribution to rethinking the history of sub-Saharan African art and culture.

She curated the exhibition "Kongo: Power and Majesty".

Selected publications
 Genesis: Ideas of Origin in African Sculpture. Metropolitan Museum of Art, New York, 2002.  
 Eternal Ancestors: The Art of the Central African Reliquary. Metropolitan Museum of Art, New York, 2007.
 Heroic Africans: Legendary Leaders, Iconic Sculptures. New York: Metropolitan Museum of Art, New York, 2011.
 "Silenced Mbembe Muses", Metropolitan Museum Journal, 48 (2013): 143–160.
 Kongo: Power and Majesty. Metropolitan Museum of Art, New York, 2015.

References

External links 
https://www.metmuseum.org/connections/africa#/Feature/

Living people
Year of birth missing (living people)
People associated with the Metropolitan Museum of Art
American art historians
Women art historians
American women historians
Columbia University alumni
Curators of African art
21st-century American women
American women curators
American curators